Embden is a census-designated place and unincorporated community in Cass County, North Dakota, United States. Its population was 59 as of the 2010 census.

Demographics

History
Embden contained a post office between 1883 and 1969. The community was named after Embden, Maine, the native home of an early settler.

References

Census-designated places in Cass County, North Dakota
Census-designated places in North Dakota
Unincorporated communities in North Dakota
Unincorporated communities in Cass County, North Dakota